André Carvalho may refer to:

 André Carvalho (Brazilian footballer) (born 1984), Brazilian football defender
 André Carvalho (Portuguese footballer) (born 1985), Portuguese football midfielder
 André Carvalho (cyclist) (born 1997), Portuguese cyclist